Cătălin Alin Vulturar (born 9 March 2004) is a Romanian footballer currently playing as a midfielder for Serie A club Lecce.

Club career
Born in Arad, Romania, Vulturar started his career with UTA Arad, making his first team debut at the age of fourteen. After rejecting an offer from FCSB, and trialling with Barcelona and Liverpool, he signed for Italian side Lecce in 2020. In completing the transfer, he became the most expensive sale in UTA Arad history.

In October 2021, he was named by English newspaper The Guardian as one of the best players born in 2004 worldwide. He has since been named captain of Lecce's under-19 side.

International career
Vulturar has represented Romania at under-18 and under-19 level.

Career statistics

Club

Notes

Honours

UTA Arad
Liga II: 2019–20

Lecce
Serie B: 2021–22

References

2004 births
Living people
Sportspeople from Arad, Romania
Romanian footballers
Romania youth international footballers
Association football midfielders
Liga II players
Serie A players
FC UTA Arad players
U.S. Lecce players
Romanian expatriate footballers
Romanian expatriate sportspeople in Italy
Expatriate footballers in Italy